Azerbaijan Airlines Flight 217 was a scheduled passenger flight between Baku and Aktau, Kazakhstan that crashed into the Caspian Sea at ca. 22:40 on 23 December 2005. The flight was operated by an Antonov An-140.

Crash
Around five minutes after a night-time departure from Baku Airport the crew reported a systems failure. Heading over the Caspian Sea at night without flight instruments made it difficult for the crew to judge their flight parameters. Whilst attempting to return to Baku, the aircraft crashed shortly afterwards on the shore of the Caspian Sea, killing all passengers and crew. Passengers included Azerbaijanis, Kazakhs, Iranians, Uzbeks and some from Western Europe nations.

Aftermath
Investigations from the Kharkov State Aircraft Manufacturing Company have discovered that three independent gyroscopes were not providing stabilised heading and altitude performance information to the crew early in the flight.

Following the accident, Azerbaijan Airlines grounded the remaining Antonov An-140's and cancelled any future plans of acquiring more of the Ukrainian-built aircraft.

References

External links

Aviation-Safety.net

2005 in Azerbaijan
Aviation accidents and incidents in 2005
Accidents and incidents involving the Antonov An-140
Airliner accidents and incidents involving controlled flight into terrain
Aviation accidents and incidents in Azerbaijan
December 2005 events in Asia
2005 disasters in Azerbaijan